NGC 229 is a lenticular galaxy located in the constellation Andromeda. It was discovered on October 10, 1879 by Édouard Stephan.

References

External links
 

0229
Andromeda (constellation)
Lenticular galaxies
Discoveries by Édouard Stephan
002577